Neverest was a Canadian pop-rock band from Toronto, Ontario. The band was formed by Spyros "Spee" Chalkiotis and Mike Klose.

Music career

About Us EP (2010–breakup)
The band released their first single, "About Us", in October 2010. It quickly reached Number 1 on the MuchMusic Top 30 countdown, and Number 30 on the Billboard Canadian Hot 100. Their second single, entitled "Everything", was released in March 2011 and quickly charted the Billboard Canadian Hot 100.
The band was managed by Backstreet Boys member Howie D.
Neverest was a supporting act on the Canadian tour dates of the NKOTBSB Tour.

Their music video for "Everything" received a nomination for the 2011 MuchMusic Video Awards for Cinematography of the Year.

Neverest released their first EP About Us on March 29, 2011. Soon after, the band embarked on their first ever concert tour, supporting Juno-nominated band Stereos. In 2011, they co-toured with Canadian artist Alyssa Reid all around Canada. Their EP consisted of 8 songs:
 About Us - 3:17
 Everything - 3:14
 Hate It - 3:18
 The Chase - 3:25
 Blame Me - 3:13
 Hello/Goodbye - 3:22
 About Us (Acoustic) - 3:29
 About Us (Club Mix) - 3:39

The band's single "About Us" received gold certification from Music Canada on December 2, 2011. In 2012, they sang the Canadian National Anthem at the All Star NBA game.

Neverest performed at We Day Halifax on November 27, 2013. This was the very first time that this event had ever been held east of Montreal. We Day was held at the Metro Centre, located in Halifax, Nova Scotia, Canada.

The band officially broke up in 2015.

Discography

Extended plays

Singles

Awards and nominations

References

External links
 

Canadian pop music groups
2007 establishments in Ontario
Musical groups disestablished in 2014
Musical groups established in 2007